Bolick Historic District, also known as Bolick Buggy Shop and Bolick Family Houses, is a national historic district located at Conover, Catawba County, North Carolina. The district encompasses 9 contributing building and 1 contributing structure. The district includes the remaining buildings of the Jerome Bolick & Sons Company buggy works and four houses with accompanying outbuildings which were erected by members of the Bolick family. The houses include examples of Colonial Revival and Bungalow / American Craftsman architecture.

It was added to the National Register of Historic Places in 1990.

References

Industrial buildings and structures on the National Register of Historic Places in North Carolina
Houses on the National Register of Historic Places in North Carolina
Historic districts on the National Register of Historic Places in North Carolina
Colonial Revival architecture in North Carolina
Houses in Catawba County, North Carolina
National Register of Historic Places in Catawba County, North Carolina